Second Lieutenant Arun Khetarpal PVC (14 October 1950 – 16 December 1971) born in Pune, Maharashtra, was an officer of the Indian Army and a posthumous recipient of the Param Vir Chakra, India's highest military decoration for valour in face of the enemy. He was killed in action in the Battle of Basantar in the Battlefield of Shakargarh during the Indo-Pakistan War of 1971 where his actions earned him his honour.

Early life
Arun Khetarpal was born in Pune, Maharashtra on 14 October 1950 into a Hindu Punjabi Khatri family. His family belonged to Sargodha, in present-day Pakistan, and had migrated to India after partition as refugees. His father Lt Col (later Brigadier) M. L. Khetarpal was a Corps of Engineers officer serving in the Indian Army and his family traced a long history of military service, with his grandfather having fought in WW1 and great-grandfather having served in Sikh Khalsa Army. Attending St. Columba's School, Delhi and The Lawrence School, Sanawar, he distinguished himself both as an able student and sportsman and was the school prefect. Khetarpal joined the National Defence Academy in June 1967. He belonged to Foxtrot Squadron where he was the Squadron Cadet Captain of the 38th Course. His NDA No was 7498/F/38. He subsequently went on to join the Indian Military Academy. On 13 June 1971, Khetarpal was commissioned into the 17 Poona Horse.

1971 War

During the Indo-Pakistan War of 1971, the 17 Poona Horse was assigned to the command of the 47th Infantry Brigade of the Indian Army. Through the duration of the conflict, the 47th Brigade saw action in the Shakargarh sector in the Battle of Basantar.

Battle of Basantar
Among the tasks set for the 47th Brigade was to establish a bridgehead across the River Basantar. By 21:00 hours of 15 December, the brigade had captured its objectives. However, the place was extensively mined, which prevented the deployment of the tanks of the Poona Horse, and the engineers clearing the mines were halfway through their tasks when Indian troops at the bridge-head reported alarming enemy armour activity, asking for immediate armour support. It was at this critical juncture that the 17 Poona Horse decided to push through the mine-field. The regiment was able to link-up with the infantry at the bridge-head by first light the next day.

Bridge-head
At 08:00 hours on 9 December, Pakistani armour launched the first of their counter-attacks under the cover of a smokescreen at the pivot of the 17th Poona Horse at Jarpal. At 08:00 hours, the Pakistani 13th Lancers, equipped with the then state-of-the-art US-made 50 ton Patton tanks, launched the first of their counter-attacks under the cover of a smokescreen at 'B' Squadron, The Poona Horse, at Jarpal. Its squadron commander urgently called for reinforcements. Arun Khetarpal, who was in 'A' squadron and was stationed close by with his Centurion tank troop, responded with alacrity, as did the rest of his regiment. The first counter-attack was decimated by accurate gunnery, coolness by Indian tank troop and individual tank commanders from the CO, Lt Col Hanut Singh down to its troop leader, Arun Khetarpal. The 13th Lancers desperately launched two more squadron-level counter-attacks and managed to achieve a breakthrough.

Khetarpal rushed to meet the Pakistani armour and launched right into the Pakistani attack. With his troop, he was able to run over the enemy advance with his tanks. However, the commander of the second tank was killed in this attack. Alone in charge, Khetarpal continued his attack on the enemy strongholds. The enemy fought very bravely and did not retreat even after taking losses. Disappointed by his failure so far, he desperately attacked the incoming Pakistani troops and tanks, knocking out a Pakistani tank in the process. However Pakistani forces regrouped and counter-attacked. In the ensuing tank battle, Lt. Arun Khetarpal with his 2 remaining tanks fought off and destroyed 10 tanks before he was killed in action.

Death
The skirmish however took its toll on the lieutenant as he was hit by enemy fire, but instead of abandoning the tank he fought on destroying one final tank before he was finally overwhelmed. However, his actions had denied a vital breakthrough for Pakistani forces and instead put the Indians in a stronger position in the Shakargarh bulge. His final words over the radio to a superior officer who had ordered him to abandon his burning tank were, 
 Then he set about destroying the remaining enemy tanks. The last enemy tank, which he shot, was barely 100 metres from his position. At this stage, his tank received a second hit and he was seriously injured. The officer met his death trying to deny the Pakistani Army its desired breakthrough.

Khetarpal's body and his tank, named "Famagusta", were later captured by Pakistan and eventually returned to the Indian military. This tank is on display back in India now.

For his conspicuous bravery and extreme gallantry in the face of fierce and unrelenting attacks and assaults by the enemy (the Pakistani military), Khetarpal was honoured with India's most-prestigious and highest-standard military medal for courage and gallantry, the Param Vir Chakra, posthumously.

Arun Khetarpal's body was cremated on 17 December near the Samba district and his ashes were sent to his family, who were unaware of his death until 26 December.

The crew of the Famagusta was Sowar Prayag Singh (the driver), Sowar Nand Singh (the radio operator), Sowar Nathu Singh (the gunner) and 2nd/Lt. Arun Khetarpal, the tank's commander. Nand Singh was first casualty (killed in action; KIA) when the tank was fatally hit in the final encounter with Pakistani Army Major Nasser's Patton tank. Arun was the second one to be killed after he sustained severe injuries when his tank was knocked out and eventually succumbed to his wounds. Both Prayag Singh and Nathu Singh were also badly wounded but survived and were captured by Pakistani troops who seized the Famagusta. Both men were later given medical treatment by their Pakistani captors and survived to the end of the war when they were repatriated and retired from the Indian Army as honorary captains.

Param Vir Chakra Citation
The Param Vir Chakra citation on the Official Indian Army Website reads as follows:

Tribute and facts
Khetrapal is an iconic figure in the ethos of the Indian Army with prominent constructions being named after him. The parade ground at NDA is named Khetarpal Ground while the auditorium and one of the main gates bear his name at the IMA.

Arun Khetarpal's Centurion was called Famagusta Jx 202. It was restored after the war and is presently preserved in the Armoured Corps Centre and School in Ahmednagar.

Legacy

The Commander of the Pakistan tank battalion is said to have met the Indian battalion commander after the battle and made enquiries about 2nd Lieutenant Khetarpal's tank since he was very impressed with the gallantry of this particular tank's commander.

In 2001, Brigadier M.L. Khetarpal – then 81 years old – felt a strong desire to visit his birthplace at Sargodha, now in Pakistan. At Lahore airport, Brigadier M.L. Khetarpal was met by Brigadier Khawja Mohammad Naser, who took it upon himself to be Brigadier M.L. Khetarpal host and guide. Brigadier Naser really went out of way to ensure that Brigadier M.L. Khetarpal had a satisfying and nostalgic visit to his old house in Sargodha. Upon his return to Lahore he was once again the guest of Brigadier Naser for three days.

Brigadier M.L. Khetarpal was overwhelmed by the extreme kindness, deference, courtesy and respect bestowed upon him by Brigadier Naser and by all the members of his family and his many servants. However Brigadier Khetarpal felt that something was amiss but could not make out what it was. Was it the long silences that punctuated their animated conversation or was it the look of compassion in the eyes of the women in the family? He could not make out but was sure he was being treated as someone very special.

Finally, on the last night before Brigadier M.L. Khetarpal's departure, Brigadier Naser said 

Brigadier M.L. Khetarpal was silent as he did not know how to react. To be enjoying the hospitality of the person who had killed his son was a confusing feeling. However being a soldier himself he genuinely admired the chivalry of an officer whose complete squadron was decimated by his son. Both the Brigadiers retired for the night deep in thought.

The next day photographs were taken and Brigadier M.L. Khetarpal returned to Delhi. Later the photos reached Delhi along with a note from Brigadier Naser that said:

In popular culture
Allu Sirish reprised Arun Khetarpal's character as Lt Chinmay in the 2017 Malayalam film 1971: Beyond Borders.

A biopic on Arun Khetarpal is being directed by Sriram Raghavan displaying his courage in the 1971 Battle of Basantar. Actor Varun Dhawan was slated to play the lead role in the film  but was no longer a part of it by 2022. It was later announced that Agastya Nanda of Bachchan family would be making his debut in the role of the protagonist and the film would be titled Ikkis (the Hindi word for 21, the age at which Khetarpal achieved martyrdom), with Dharmendra co-starring.

See also
The Poona Horse

References

External links
 A Deathless Hero 2Lt Arun Khetrapal, PVC..
 Indian Army webpage

1950 births
1971 deaths
Indian military personnel killed in action
Recipients of the Param Vir Chakra
Lawrence School, Sanawar alumni
People of the Indo-Pakistani War of 1971
Indian military personnel of the Indo-Pakistani War of 1971